Carabus sylvosus, the woodland ground beetle, is a species of ground beetle in the family Carabidae. It is found in North America.

Subspecies
These two subspecies belong to the species Carabus sylvosus:
 Carabus sylvosus lherminieri Dejean, 1826
 Carabus sylvosus sylvosus

References

Further reading

 

sylvosus
Articles created by Qbugbot
Beetles described in 1823